San Bernardino is a municipality in the Suchitepéquez department of Guatemala.

Municipalities of the Suchitepéquez Department
Populated places in the Suchitepéquez Department